16 Most Requested Songs is a compilation album of 16 Top 40 hits that Bobby Vinton had for Epic Records. It is the last of 29 collections in the 16 Most Requested Songs series that was released by Epic. Unlike most collections of Vinton's music, the song "Roses Are Red (My Love)" is the last track on this album, rather than the first. Inside the album cover is a biographical essay about Vinton's life and career that was written by Will Friedwald (the author of Jazz Singing). Although this album was released in 1991, it did not enter the charts until five years later. It was the first compilation of Vinton's music in the charts since the release of Bobby Vinton Sings the Golden Decade of Love 21 years before.

Track listing

Album credits
 Digital producer: Nedra Olds-Neal
 Digitally remixed and remastered by Mark Wilder, Sony Music Studios, New York
 Product manager: Joanne Beattie
 Packaging coordinator: Hope Chasin
 Illustration: Bill Nelson

Charts

Album - Billboard (North America)

References

1991 compilation albums
Bobby Vinton compilation albums
Epic Records compilation albums
Legacy Recordings compilation albums